Günzburg, a surname of Bavarian origin. Ginsberg, Ginsburg, Gensburg, Ginsburgh, Ginzberg, Ginzborg, and Ginzburg are variants of the surname.

History
The Günzburg (Cyrillic: Гинзбург Ginzburg, Гинцбург Gintsburg; 
 Ginzburg, גינצבורג Gintsburg) family originated in the town of Günzburg, Bavaria. It is believed that the family went there from the city of Ulm, Württemberg, and that for this reason the best-known progenitor of the family and some of his immediate descendants, as well as certain others, called themselves "Ulma-Günzburg".

It is also an Ashkenazi Jewish surname. When, early in the emancipation period, the 
Jews of Russia and of Austria were ordered by their governments to adopt family names, it was natural that many of them should choose a name so respected and pleasing as that of Günzburg. There is on record a lawsuit instituted by Baer Günzburg of Grodno against a Jewish family of that city who had adopted the same name under the decree of 1804. The court sustained the right of Jewish families to adopt any name they chose, and the number of Günzburg families accordingly increased.

The name is composed of two German elements. Burg means "castle" or "citadel". This commonly was also used to describe a walled settlement or town, hence common usage in town names such as Hamburg (from Old German: Hammaburg, lit. "castle above the river bend"). The river name Günz is ultimately derived from the Indo-European root , meaning "to pour". Thus, Günzburg refers to a "fortified town by the river Günz".

Gunzburg, Günzburg
 Akiva Günzburg ( 1597), German poet and rabbi
 Aryeh Leib ben Asher Gunzberg, rabbi
 Baron Joseph Günzburg, (1812–1878) Russian-Jewish banker, philanthropist and communal leader
 Baron Horace Günzburg, (1833–1909) Russian-Jewish banker, philanthropist and communal leader
 Baron David Günzburg, (1857–1910) Russian orientalist and Jewish communal leader
 Baron Nicolas de Gunzburg, (1904–1981) socialite, editor, actor, producer
 Mordecai Aaron Günzburg (1795–1846), writer
 Nico Gunzburg, (1882–1984) Belgian lawyer and criminologist
 Isidor Gunsberg, (1854–1930), Hungarian-born British challenger for the World Chess Championship
 Milton Gunzburg, (1910–1991) American screenwriter and inventor

Gunzbourg
 Baron Philippe de Gunzbourg (1904–1986). French aristocrat and Special Operations Executive agent during the Second World War.

Ginsberg
 Allen Ginsberg (1926–1997), Beat poet
 Asher Hirsch Ginsberg ("Achad Ha'am"; 1856–1927), Zionist writer and philosopher
 Benjamin Ginsberg (disambiguation), multiple people, including:
Benjamin Ginsberg (businessman) (died 1944), South African businessman
Benjamin Ginsberg (lawyer) (born circa 1952), American attorney and lobbyist
Benjamin Ginsberg (political scientist) (born 1947), American political scientist
Brian Ginsberg (born 1966), American gymnast, two-time US junior national gymnastics champion
Inge Ginsberg (1922 - 2021), Swiss lyricist, journalist and heavy metal singer
 Morris Ginsberg (1889–1970), British sociologist
 Harold Louis Ginsberg (1903–1990), Jewish bible scholar
 Naomi Ginsberg (born 1979), Assistant Professor of Chemistry, University of California, Berkeley

Ginsburg

 Benson Ginsburg (1918–2016), American behavior geneticist
 Chad I Ginsburg (born 1972), lead guitarist and mixer/producer of the modern rock band CKY
 Charles Ginsburg (1920–1992), leader of a research team that developed one of the first practical videotape recorders
 Charlotte Lucy Ginsburg, best known as Charlotte Gainsbourg (born 1971), English-French actress and singer-songwriter, daughter of Serge Gainsbourg
 Christian David Ginsburg (1831–1914), Polish-UK Hebrew language scholar
 Douglas H. Ginsburg (born 1946), Chief Judge of the United States Court of Appeals for the District of Columbia Circuit
 Isaac Ginsburg (1886–1975) Lithuanian-born American ichthyologist
 James Steven Ginsburg (born 1965), American classical music producer
 Martin D. Ginsburg (1932–2010), American lawyer
 Ophira Ginsburg, Canadian oncologist
 Ruth Bader Ginsburg (1933–2020), American jurist and United States Supreme Court justice
 Saul Moiseyevich Ginsburg (1866-1940), Russian author and historian
 Serge Gainsbourg, né Lucien Ginsburg, (1928–1991) French singer, songwriter, pianist, film composer, poet, painter, screenwriter, writer, actor and director
 Seymour Ginsburg (1927–2004), computer science pioneer of automata, formal language, and database theories
 Shiphra Ginsburg, Canadian physician-scientist
 William H. Ginsburg (1943–2013), American lawyer

Ginzburg
 Alexander Ginzburg, best known as Alexander Galich (1918-1977), Soviet poet, screenwriter, playwright, singer-songwriter and dissident
Alexander Ginzburg (1936–2002), Russian journalist, poet, human rights activist and dissident
Boni Ginzburg (born 1964), Israeli footballer
Carlo Ginzburg (born 1939), historian and pioneer of microhistory, son of Natalia Ginzburg and Leone Ginzburg
Grigory Ginzburg (1904–1961), Jewish-born Russian pianist
Irena Hausmanowa-Petrusewicz, née Ginzburg (1917 — 2015), Polish doctor, neurologist
Leo Ginzburg (1901–1979), Russian conductor and pianist of Polish origin
Leone Ginzburg (1909–1944), Russian-born Italian Jewish writer and anti-fascist
Lev R. Ginzburg (born 1945), theoretical ecologist
Lidiya Ginzburg (1902–1990), major Soviet literary critic and a survivor of the siege of Leningrad
Moisei Ginzburg (1892–1946), Belarus-born Russian architect
Natalia Ginzburg (born Levi) (1916—1991), Italian author
Nora Ginzburg (born 1949), Argentina lawyer and politician
Oren Ginzburg, French-Israeli writer and cartoonist
Ralph Ginzburg (1929–2006), American publisher of Eros Magazine
Semyon Alexandrovich Ginzburg (died 1943), Soviet armored vehicles designer
Victor Ginzburg (born 1957), American mathematician, born in Russia
Viktor Ginzburg (1962), Russian-American mathematician
Vitaly Ginzburg (1916–2009), Russian physicist and laureate of the Nobel Prize of Physics
Yevgenia Ginzburg (1904–1977), Russian historian and writer, mother of Vasily Aksyonov

Other spellings

Gainsbourg 

 Charlotte Gainsbourg (born 1971), English-French actress and singer-songwriter.
 Serge Gainsbourg (1928-1991), French singer-songwriter born Lucien Ginsburg.

Gensburg
 Robert Gensburg, American attorney

Ginsborg
 Paul Ginsborg (1945), British historian
 Ralf Ginsborg (1927–2006), Danish footballer

Ginsbourg
 Mark Ginsbourg, birth name of Mark Gayn (1902-1981), Russia-born American left-wing journalist

Ginsburgh
 Stéphane Ginsburgh (born 1969), Belgian pianist
 Victor Ginsburgh (born 1939), Belgian economist
 Yitzchak Ginsburgh (born 1944), Israeli rabbi

Gintsburg
Aleksandr Gintsburg (1907-1972), Soviet cameraman and film director
Alexander Gintsburg (born 1951), Soviet and Russian microbiologist

Ginzberg
 Rabbi Louis Ginzberg (1873-1953), one of the outstanding Talmud scholars of the twentieth century.

Ginzburg
 Esti Ginzburg (born 1990), Israeli model

Ginsparg
 Paul Ginsparg (born 1955), American theoretical physicist and creator of the ArXiv e-print archive

See also 
 Günsberg, municipality in the district of Lebern, canton of Solothurn, Switzerland

References

 Eisenstadt-Wiener, Da‘at, pp. 198–212, St. Petersburg, 1897–98;
 Belinsohn, Shillume Emune Yisrael, Odessa, 1898;
 Belinsohn, Ein Wort über die Familie Guenzburg, St. Petersburg, 1858. The chief source is Maggid's work, quoted above.

Jewish surnames
German-language surnames
Yiddish-language surnames